George Weigel (born 1951) is a Catholic neoconservative American author, political analyst, and social activist. He currently serves as a Distinguished Senior Fellow of the Ethics and Public Policy Center. Weigel was the Founding President of the James Madison Foundation. He is the author of a best-selling biography of Pope John Paul II, Witness to Hope, and Tranquillitas Ordinis: The Present Failure and Future Promise of American Catholic Thought on War and Peace.

Career and personal life
Weigel was born and grew up in Baltimore, Maryland, where he attended St. Mary's Seminary and University. In 1975 he received a Master of Arts degree from the University of St. Michael's College with a thesis entitled Karl Rahner's Theology of the Incarnation in Light of his Philosophy of Transcendental Anthropology.  He has received 18 honorary doctorate degrees, as well as the papal cross Pro Ecclesia et Pontifice and the Gloria Artis Gold Medal from the Polish Ministry of Culture.

Weigel lived in the Compton area, serving as Assistant Professor of Theology and Assistant Dean of Studies at the St. Thomas the Apostle Seminary School of Theology in Kenmore, Washington, and Scholar-in-Residence at the World Without War Council of Greater Seattle, before returning to Washington, D.C., as a fellow at the Woodrow Wilson International Center for Scholars.

Weigel served as the founding president of the James Madison Foundation (not to be confused with the James Madison Memorial Fellowship Foundation) from 1986 to 1989. In 1994, he was a signer of the document Evangelicals and Catholics Together.

He currently serves as Distinguished Senior Fellow and Chair of Catholic Studies at the Ethics and Public Policy Center in Washington, D.C.

Each summer, Weigel and several other Catholic intellectuals from the United States, Poland, and across Europe conduct the Tertio Millennio Seminar on the Free Society in Kraków, in which they and an assortment of students from the United States, Poland, and several other emerging democracies in Central and Eastern Europe discuss Christianity within the context of liberal democracy and capitalism, with the papal encyclical Centesimus annus being the focal point.

Weigel and his wife Joan live in north Bethesda, Maryland. They have three children.

He is a member of the advisory council of the Victims of Communism Memorial Foundation. Weigel writes and serves on the board for the Institute for Religion and Public Life, which publishes First Things, an ecumenical publication that focuses on encouraging a religiously informed public philosophy for the ordering of society.

Views
The main body of Weigel's writings engage the issues of religion and culture.

Weigel advocates a US foreign policy guided not by utopian notions about how nations should behave, but by moral reasoning.

From the Iliad to Tolstoy and beyond, that familiar trope, "the fog of war," has been used to evoke the millennia–old experience of the radical uncertainty of combat. Some analysts, however, take the trope of "the fog of war" a philosophical step further and suggest that warfare takes place beyond the reach of moral reason, in a realm of interest and necessity where moral argument is a pious diversion at best and, at worst, a lethal distraction from the deadly serious business at hand.

In some cases, he adds, moral reasoning may require that the United States support authoritarian regimes to fend off the greater evils of moral decay and threats to the security of the United States. For Weigel, America's shortcomings do not excuse it from pursuing the greater moral good.

Weigel achieved much fame for writing Witness to Hope, a biography of the late Pope John Paul II, which was also made into a documentary film.

In 2004 Weigel wrote an article in Commentary magazine entitled "The Cathedral and the Cube" in which he used the contrast between the modernist Grande Arche de la Défense, and the Notre Dame de Paris cathedral, both located in Paris, France, to illustrate what he called a loss of "civilizational morale" in Western Europe, which he tied to the secular tyrannies of the 20th century, along with, more recently, plummeting birthrates and Europe's refusal to recognize the Christian roots of its culture. The article helped to popularize the word Christophobia, a term coined by the Jewish legal scholar Joseph Weiler, in 2003.

Weigel questions whether Europe can give an account of itself while denying the very moral tradition through which its culture arose: "Christians who share this conviction (that it is the will of God that Christians be tolerant of those who have a different view of God's will) – can give an account of their defense of the other's freedom even if the other, skeptical and relativist, finds it hard to give an account of the freedom of the Christian." This is a theme sounded clearly by Marcello Pera and Cardinal Joseph Ratzinger (from 2005 to 2013 Pope Benedict XVI), in their book Without Roots: the West, Relativism, Christianity, Islam, for which Weigel authored the foreword. In 2005, he expanded the article into a book, The Cube and the Cathedral: Europe, America, and Politics Without God, which has been cited in the context of "Eurabia literature", which Weigel has himself cited as a possible future scenario for Europe.

On January 27, 2017, in response to rumours that Weigel would be appointed ambassador to the Holy See, then-Cardinal Theodore Edgar McCarrick wrote to Pope Francis stating that Weigel was "very much a leader of the ultra-conservative wing of the Catholic Church in the United States and has been publicly critical of Your Holiness in the past." He added, "Many of us American bishops would have great concerns about his being named to such a position in which he would have an official voice, in opposition to your teaching." McCarrick indicated he would be happy to discuss the topic further with the Pope, but there are no indications in their correspondence whether he ever did so.

Following the controversial September 2006 lecture of Pope Benedict XVI at Regensburg, Weigel defended the Pope's call for interreligious dialogue based on reason.

In January 2009, Weigel expressed concern on the lifting of the excommunications of the bishops of the Society of Saint Pius X, essentially because the group has been critical of some aspects of the Second Vatican Council, especially its teaching on religious liberty, which Weigel strongly defends.

Weigel was critical of the 2019 Amazon Synod and the structure of church synods in general, saying that they never fully represent what lay Catholics believe and describing them as a masquerade for the intrusion of progressive ideologies into the Catholic church. "Propaganda about 'synodality' that functions as rhetorical cover for the imposition of the progressive Catholic agenda on the whole Church is not an improvement on that track record; it's a masquerade, behind which is an agenda."

Publications

Books 
 To Sanctify the World: The Vital Legacy of Vatican II, Basic Books, 2022 
 Not Forgotten: Elegies For, and Reminiscences Of, a Diverse Cast of Characters, Most of Them Admirable, Ignatius Press, 2021 
 The Next Pope: The Office of Peter and a Church in Mission, Ignatius Press, 2020 
 The Irony of Modern Catholic History: How the Church Rediscovered Itself and Challenged the Modern World to Reform, Basic Books, 2019, 
 The Fragility of Order: Catholic Reflections on Turbulent Times, Ignatius Press, 2018, 
 Lessons in Hope: My Unexpected Life with St. John Paul II, Basic Books, 2017, 
 City of Saints: A Pilgrimage to John Paul II's Kraków, Crown Publishing Group, 2015, Co-Authors: Carrie Gress, Stephen Weigel 
 Roman Pilgrimage: The Station Churches, Basic Books, 2013, Co-Authors: Elizabeth Lev, Stephen Weigel 
 Evangelical Catholicism: Deep Reform in the 21st-Century Catholic Church, Basic Books, 2013, 
 The End and the Beginning: Pope John Paul II–The Victory of Freedom, the Last Years, the Legacy, Doubleday, 2010, 
 Against the Grain: Christianity and Democracy, War and Peace, Crossroad, 2008, .
 Faith, Reason, and the War Against Jihadism: A Call to Action, Doubleday, 2007, .
 God's Choice: Pope Benedict XVI and the Future of the Catholic Church, HarperCollins, 2005, .
 The Cube and the Cathedral:  Europe, America, and Politics Without God, Basic Books, 2005, .
 Letters to a Young Catholic, Basic Books, 2004, .
 The Courage To Be Catholic: Crisis, Reform, and the Future of the Church, Basic Books, 2002, .
 The Truth of Catholicism: Ten Controversies Explored, HarperCollins, 2001, .
 Witness to Hope: The Biography of Pope John Paul II, HarperCollins, 1999, .
 Soul of the World: Notes on the Future of Public Catholicism, Eerdmans, 1996, .
 The Final Revolution: The Resistance Church and the Collapse of Communism, Oxford University Press, 1992, .
 Just War and the Gulf War, co-authored with Johnson, James Turner. Ethics and Public Policy Center, 1991, .
 Freedom and Its Discontents: Catholicism Confronts Modernity, Ethics and Public Policy Center, 1991, .
 American Interests, American Purpose: Moral Reasoning and U.S. Foreign Policy, Praeger Publishers, 1989, .
 Catholicism and the Renewal of American Democracy, Paulist Press, 1989, .
 Tranquillitas Ordinis: The Present Failure and Future Promise of American Catholic Thought on War and Peace, Oxford University Press, 1987, .

References

External links
Unofficial Blog with links to archived articles
Archdiocese of Denver: Denver Catholic Register: The Catholic Difference (home of Weigel's syndicated column The Catholic Difference)
Ethics and Public Policy Center: George Weigel
Political Research Associates: Right Web: George Weigel
SourceWatch: George Weigel
National Review Online: George Weigel archive
Newsweek: George Weigel archive
Audio interview with National Review Online
The Pew Forum on Religion & Public Life: The Vatican and Islam: Pope Benedict XVI Prepares to Visit Turkey (interview with Weigel and John Esposito)

In Depth interview with Weigel, June 1, 2008
Pope Wants a Church of the Poor and For the Poor, But a Well-known Catholic Writer Rejects Saint Francis of Assisi Catholic Worker July 5, 2013
 The Easter Effect and How It Changed The World WSJ March 30, 2018
 George Weigel: New Evangelization is Future of Catholicism, EWTN/National Catholic Register

1951 births
American male non-fiction writers
American political writers
American Roman Catholic religious writers
Living people
New Right (United States)
People from Bethesda, Maryland
Recipients of the Gold Medal for Merit to Culture – Gloria Artis
St. Mary's Seminary and University alumni
University of Toronto alumni
Writers from Baltimore
Catholics from Maryland
Ethics and Public Policy Center
Carnegie Council for Ethics in International Affairs